Zaitseve is a village in Bakhmut Raion (district) in Donetsk Oblast of eastern Ukraine, at about  northeast by north (NEbN) from of the centre of Donetsk city, about  southwards from the southern border of Bakhmut. It belongs to Bakhmut urban hromada, one of the hromadas of Ukraine.

The settlement came under attack by Russian forces during the Russian invasion of Ukraine in 2022.

References

Villages in Bakhmut Raion